Joel Fry is a British actor and musician, having had roles in White Van Man, Trollied, Plebs, Twenty Twelve, and W1A. In film, he appeared as Lu'kibu in 10,000 BC, Rocky in the 2019 romantic comedy film Yesterday. In 2023, Fry starred in a main role as 'Hugh', the solicitor to Burnley banker Dave Fishwick in the film Bank of Dave.

Career 
Fry studied acting at the Royal Academy of Dramatic Art (RADA), graduating with a BA in Acting Degree (H Level) in 2005.  On television, he is best known for portraying the characters Hizdahr zo Loraq in the series Game of Thrones  and Frenchie in Our Flag Means Death. Further television credits include White Van Man, Trollied, Plebs, Twenty Twelve, and W1A. In film, he appeared as Lu'kibu in 10,000 BC, Rocky in the 2019 romantic comedy film Yesterday, and Jasper Badun in the 2021 crime comedy-drama Cruella.

In 2023, Fry starred in a main role as 'Hugh', the solicitor to Burnley banker Dave Fishwick (played by Rory Kinnear) in the film Bank of Dave, released on Netflix in January 2023.

Music
Fry is a former member of the band Animal Circus, which released the EP Snakes and Ladders in 2012. 

Fry is featured in two songs on the 2022 Our Flag Means Death soundtrack, where he performs as his character, Frenchie.

Filmography

Film

Television

Discography

Animal Circus
 2012 – Snakes and Ladders

References

External links

Living people
British male television actors
English people of Jamaican descent
British male film actors
21st-century British male actors
Alumni of RADA
Year of birth missing (living people)